A major east–west commercial artery in northern Miami-Dade County,  State Road 932 (SR 932) is a  four-lane highway connecting U.S. Route 27 (US 27) in Hialeah Gardens and SR 915 in Miami Shores, just south of the campus of Barry University.  Locally, SR 932 is also known as North 103rd Street in greater Miami, and as 49th Street or Palm Springs Mile in Hialeah.

Route description
The western portion of SR 932 in Hialeah Gardens and Hialeah from US 27 to SR 823 is almost completely lined with commercial establishments (next to its interchange with the Palmetto Expressway (SR 826) is Westland Mall, one of the oldest enclosed shopping centers in Florida; across the street is Miami Dade College – Hialeah Campus). East of Red Road/SR 823 (West 4th Avenue in Hialeah), SR 932 is almost entirely lined with suburban developments, crossing the Miami Canal, passing by Medley, and ending at SR 915. Liberty City and Biscayne Park are within a quarter mile of the eastern terminus.

History
Originally State Road 850, SR 932 received its current designation from the Florida Department of Transportation in 1983 as part of a statewide reassignment of state road numbers.

State Road 932’s connection with the Palmetto Expressway has similarly evolved from a little-used at-grade intersection in the early-1960s to a diamond interchange in the 1970s that was often overwhelmed in the 1990s and augmented by a flyover ramp in the 2000s.  In contrast to the now-congested western end, the eastern end of SR 932 hasn’t seen significant change in traffic since the 1960s.

Major intersections

References

932
932
Hialeah, Florida